Courtney Reum (born July 8 in Wayne, Illinois) is an American entrepreneur, product developer and the co-founder of the Los Angeles-based investment firm M13.

Early life 

Courtney Reum grew up in a rural suburb of Chicago called Wayne, Illinois, where he was raised by his mother, Sherry, and his father Robert Reum. The former CEO of Amsted Industries, Robert was also a member of the Yale Bulldogs basketball team during its famous 1962 season that ended in the NCAA tournament (their last appearance until 2016). Reum studied economics and philosophy and graduated with distinction from Columbia University, where he was a member of the Varsity Men's Soccer Team. He is also an alumnus of Harvard Business School. His brother, Carter Reum is married to Paris Hilton. He also has a sister, Halle Reum, who is married to Oliver Hammond, a scion of the Annenberg family.

He has been featured on the Forbes "30 Under 30" list, the Inc "500 fastest growing private companies in America," Richard Branson's book Screw Business as Usual, and most recently the Goldman Sachs Builders + Innovators 100 Most Intriguing Entrepreneurs. He is a columnist for Inc Magazine, and an occasional media personality appearing on the television series Hatched which appears on a variety of networks including FOX and CBS.  Reum was added to the board of directors of Los Angeles Opera in September 2015. He also serves as commissioner of the Los Angeles Convention Center & Tourism Authority.

Career 

He is a former investment banker at Goldman Sachs who worked with companies including Under Armour, Vitaminwater and Procter & Gamble. At Goldman Sachs he worked on the merger of Allied Domecq and Pernod Ricard, an experience that led to the creation of his own alcohol company, VeeV, which he launched with his brother. Together, they made the company a national brand  available in bars, restaurants, national chains and retailers.  The product also spawned the first line of certified organic RTD cocktails called VitaFrute. Reum and his brother, Carter, sold the brand in 2016.

Reum was made an Inc "500 Fastest Growing Private Companies in America" and named one of Beverage Information's Rising Stars and recipient of the Technomic Fast 50 Award.

Reum launched the investment and brand development firm M13 with his partner/brother Carter Reum in 2016. The investment firm focuses on start-up consumer product companies whose intention and brand messaging appeal to the trends that interest Millennials in health, environmental concerns and achievements. In April 2016 it was reported that M13 would be syndicating $100 million in investments into dozens of start up companies.

References 

Harvard Business School alumni
Goldman Sachs people
Year of birth missing (living people)
Living people
Columbia College (New York) alumni